Autosticha sichunica is a moth in the family Autostichidae. It was described by Kyu-Tek Park and Chun-Sheng Wu in 2003. It is found in the Chinese provinces of Sichuan, Hainan and Fujian.

Description 
The wingspan of the moth is 14–15 mm. Its forewings are a creamy white, speckled with black scales. There are three large black dots along the subbasal line and three similar dots near the middle, three-fourths on the costa and at the middle of the termen. The first discal stigma is found at the middle of the cell, the plical below the first and the second at the end of the cell. There are three pairs of marginal dots before the apex and several dots along the termen, as well as brownish suffusion before the tornus. The hindwings are pale grey.

Etymology
The species name is derived from the type location.

References

Moths described in 2003
Autosticha
Moths of Asia